M. officinalis may refer to:
 Magnolia officinalis, a plant species native to the mountains and valleys of China
 Melilotus officinalis, a legume species
 Melissa officinalis, the lemon balm, a plant species

See also
 Officinalis